Campy most commonly refers to Camp (style). 

It is also a nickname for:

People: 
 Bert Campaneris (born 1942), American retired Major League Baseball player
 Roy Campanella (1921–1993), American Hall-of-Fame Major League Baseball catcher
 Campy Russell (born 1952), American retired National Basketball Association player
 Lee Camp (footballer) (born 1984), English-born Northern Ireland footballer
 Lee Camp (comedian) (born 1980), American comedian, writer, podcaster, news journalist and news commentator
Other:
 Campagnolo, Italian manufacturer of bicycle components
 Campylobacter, a genus of bacteria

Lists of people by nickname